Safeen Muhsin Dizayee is a politician Kurd and serving as a Minister and Head of the Department of Foreign Relations of the Kurdistan Regional Government since July 2019.> Dizayee is also a member of the Kurdistan Democratic Party.

Political career 

From his previous posts, Dizayee was the Chief of staff to the Prime Minister Nechirvan Barzani, as well as Spokesperson and Head of Department of Media and Information (DMI) of the Kurdistan Regional Government at the 7th and 8th cabinets.  Prior to that, he served as Minister of Education of the Kurdistan Regional Government 6th cabinet from 2009 to 2012.  Dizayee headed the Kurdistan Democratic Party International Relations Office from 2004 to 2009. In 1992, Dizayee officially appointed as Kurdistan Democratic Party (KDP)'s representative in Turkey.

References 

1963 births
Iraqi Kurdish people
Kurdish politicians
Living people